The women's 1500 metres at the 2019 World Para Athletics Championships was held in Dubai on 10, 11, 14 and 15 November 2019.

Medalists

T11

T13

T20

T54

See also 
List of IPC world records in athletics

References 

1500 metres
2019 in women's athletics
1500 metres at the World Para Athletics Championships